Agostina Denisse Soria (born ) is an Argentine female volleyball player. She is part of the Argentina women's national volleyball team.

She participated in the 2015 FIVB Volleyball Girls' U18 World Championship, 2017 FIVB Volleyball Women's U20 World Championship, 2018 FIVB Volleyball Women's World Championship, and 2018 FIVB Volleyball Women's Nations League
 
At club level she played for Velez Sarsfield in 2018.

References

External links 
 http://www.volleyball.world/en/vnl/women/teams/arg-argentina/players/agostina-denisse-soria?id=64551
 www.volleyball.world/en/women/schedule/8867-japan-argentina/post
 http://www.norceca.net/2018%20Events/XVII%20Women%20PanCup-2018/Calendar-P-2-3/P-3%20for%20match%204_%20ARG-COL.pdf
 https://web.archive.org/web/20180831211838/http://www.mail.worldofvolley.com/News/Latest_news/Argentina/100145/bomba-from-argentina-nizetich-kicked-out-of-the-team-sosa-is-back-full-list.html

1998 births
Living people
Argentine women's volleyball players